Maximillian James Aarons (born 4 January 2000) is an English professional footballer who plays as a defender for  club Norwich City. He is primarily a right-back, but can also play as a left-back.

Club career
Aarons began his career at Luton Town, and moved to join Norwich City's academy in 2016. He signed a three-year professional contract with the Canaries in June 2018, before making his debut in an EFL Cup game against Stevenage on 14 August. His first senior goal also came in the EFL Cup, as he concluded a 3–1 win over Cardiff City two weeks later. Aarons made his first league appearance on 2 September, starting in the East Anglian derby against Ipswich Town, a 1–1 draw. On 10 October, he extended his contract at the club until June 2023.

In March 2019 he was selected to the 2018–19 Championship Team of the Season, and was also awarded the 2018–19 EFL Young Player of the Season award. He was promoted with Norwich to the Premier League after a 2–1 victory over Blackburn Rovers.

In April 2021 he was nominated for the EFL Young Player of the Season.

In January 2022, Aarons made his 150th appearance for Norwich City in a Premier League match against West Ham United.

International career
After breaking into the Norwich City first team at the start of the 2018–19 season, Aarons earned a call-up to the England under-19 team in September 2018.

On 30 August 2019, Aarons was included in the England U21 squad for the first time  and made his debut during the 3–2 2021 U21 Euro qualifying win against Turkey on 6 September 2019.

Despite his England caps, in March 2021 it was reported that Aarons would be called up to the Jamaica national team, as part of a plot by the Jamaican Football Federation to purposely target a number of English and English-born players for call ups in order to increase the nation's chances of qualifying for the 2022 World Cup. JFF president Michael Ricketts claimed that Aarons was going to apply for a Jamaican passport in order to play for the nation. However, Aarons subsequently revealed he had not been contacted by Jamaica, stating: "I am able to play for Jamaica but I never heard anything from them or whatever. I had people messaging me, a few family members from Jamaica, and I had to say that I hadn't heard anything". Aarons also revealed that he had no interest in playing for anyone other than his home nation, commenting: "my full focus is definitely on England".

Personal life
Aarons is of Jamaican descent. He is the cousin of Huddersfield Town player Rolando Aarons.

Career statistics

Honours
Norwich City
EFL Championship: 2018–19, 2020–21

Individual
EFL Young Player of the Year: 2018–19
EFL Team of the Season: 2018–19 2020–21
PFA Team of the Year: 2018–19 Championship 2020–21 Championship
EFL Young Player of the Month: December 2020

References

External links

2000 births
Living people
Footballers from Hammersmith
English footballers
England youth international footballers
England under-21 international footballers
Association football defenders
Luton Town F.C. players
Norwich City F.C. players
English Football League players
Premier League players
English sportspeople of Jamaican descent